The William T. E. Wilson Homestead, located in Sisters, Oregon, is a house that is listed on the National Register of Historic Places.

See also
 National Register of Historic Places listings in Deschutes County, Oregon

References

Houses on the National Register of Historic Places in Oregon
National Register of Historic Places in Deschutes County, Oregon
Sisters, Oregon
Houses completed in 1903
1903 establishments in Oregon
Houses in Deschutes County, Oregon
Historic districts on the National Register of Historic Places in Oregon